Paludiavis  is a genus of extinct waterbirds in the Pelecaniformes family. It was described from fossil tarsometatarsus pieces, one found in the Upper Miocene series of the Shivalik Formation in northern Pakistan and the other, a 1972 find that is also from the Upper Miocence, of Tunisia, referred by Colin Harrison and Cyril Walker to the same genus. The genus consists of only one species, Paludavis richae.

References

Prehistoric birds
Cenozoic birds of Africa
Cenozoic birds of Asia
Miocene birds
Fossil taxa described in 1982
Pelecaniformes